Radium sulfate (or radium sulphate) is an inorganic compound with the formula RaSO4 and an average molecular mass of 322.088 g/mol. This salt is the least soluble of all known sulfate salts. It was formerly used in radiotherapy and smoke detectors, but this has been phased out in favor of less hazardous alternatives.

Properties
Radium sulfate crystallises in a solid in the same structure as barium sulfate. It forms crystals in the orthorhombic crystal system, with a unit cell of dimensions a = 9.07 b=5.52 and c = 7.28 Å. The unit cell volume is 364 Å3. Distance from the radium ion to oxygen is 2.96  Å and the sulfur to oxygen bond length in the sulfate ion is 1.485  Å. In this compound the ionic radius of the radium ion is 1.66 Å, and it is in ten coordination.

Radium sulfate can form solid solutions with the sulfates of strontium, barium or lead.

References 

Radium compounds
Sulfates